The emo revival (also known as the post-emo revival, the Midwestern emo revival, and fourth wave emo) was an underground emo movement which came about in the late 2000s to early 2010s. Groups of the emo revival largely abandon the style of the mainstream emo acts of the mid 2000s in favor of a style influenced by 1990s emo acts. The revival had largely dissolved by the mid 2010s.

History and characteristics

By the early 2010s emo had largely waned in commercial popularity. A number of bands that were popular during the mid 2000s either broke up or changed their sound. Meanwhile, an underground revival began to emerge with bands such as Snowing and Algernon Cadwallader being forerunners of the movement. Bands of the revival are influenced by the second wave emo acts from the Midwestern emo scene of the 1990s and early 2000s. Bands often display a "DIY sound" and lyrical themes range from nostalgia to adulthood. Emo revival scenes have sprung up throughout the United States and United Kingdom, with notable scenes in cities such as Philadelphia which has produced important groups to the scene such as Everyone Everywhere, Modern Baseball, Hop Along, Cayetana, Jank, Marietta, Algernon Cadwallader, and Snowing. Other important emo revival acts include Citizen, Title Fight, The World Is a Beautiful Place & I Am No Longer Afraid to Die, Touché Amoré, Into It. Over It., Tiny Moving Parts, Foxing, The Front Bottoms, Turnover, Tigers Jaw, Dads, Dowsing, Joyce Manor, Joie De Vivre, My Heart To Joy, Empire! Empire! (I Was a Lonely Estate), Dikembe, Crash of Rhinos, A Great Big Pile Of Leaves, Balance and Composure, OWEL, You Blew It!,The Brave Little Abacus and the Hotelier. This revival has also been credited with, even further, expanding the style of emo, with many bands introducing new elements and sounds while keeping the "classic twinkly emo sound".

Since the emo revival began in the early 2010, various emo bands from the 1990s and early 2000s have reunited for reunion tours or permanent reunions American Football, Cap'n Jazz, The Anniversary, Braid, Mineral, and The Promise Ring.

During the mid 2010s, the revival had largely begun to dissolve, although bands such as Hot Mulligan and Origami Angel continue to produce underground emo music.

Screamo revival
In the early 2010s the term screamo began to be largely reclaimed by a new crop of do-it-yourself bands, with many screamo acts, like Loma Prieta, Pianos Become the Teeth, La Dispute, and Touché Amoré releasing records on fairly large independent labels such as Deathwish Inc. In 2011 Alternative Press noted that La Dispute is "at the forefront of a traditional-screamo revival" for their critically acclaimed release Wildlife. They are a part of a group of stylistically similar screamo-revival bands self-defined as "The Wave," made up of Touché Amoré, La Dispute, Defeater, Pianos Become the Teeth, and Make Do and Mend.

Some notable post-hardcore outfits have also been included as part of the screamo revival including Before Their Eyes, The Ongoing Concept, Too Close to Touch, I Am Terrified and Saosin. Alternative Press has referred to this style as the "pop-screamo revival", citing bands such as Senses Fail, Silverstein, The Used, Hawthorne Heights, Chiodos, Thursday, From First to Last, Thrice and Finch as massive influences on the sound.

In August 2018, Noisey writer Dan Ozzi declared that it was the "Summer of Screamo" in a month-long series documenting screamo acts pushing the genre forward following the decline in popularity of "The Wave," as well as the reunions of seminal bands such as Pg. 99, Majority Rule, City of Caterpillar, and Jeromes Dream. Groups highlighted in this coverage, including Respire, Ostraca, Portrayal of Guilt, Soul Glo, I Hate Sex, and Infant Island, had generally received positive press from large publications, but were not as widely successful as their predecessors. Noisey also documented that, despite its loss of mainstream popularity and continued hold in North American scenes, particularly Richmond, Virginia, screamo had become a more international movement; notably spreading to Japan, France, and Sweden with groups including Heaven in Her Arms, Birds in Row, and Suffocate for Fuck Sake, respectively. Also in 2018, Vein released their debut album Errorzone to critical acclaim and commercial success, bringing together elements of screamo, hardcore, and nu metal. The band SeeYouSpaceCowboy has been associated with "the sassy screamo revival" and takes influence from screamo/post-hardcore band The Blood Brothers.

Criticism of the term
The term "emo revival" has been the cause of controversy. Numerous artists and journalists have stated that it is not a revival at all and people have simply stopped paying attention to underground emo. In 2013, Evan Weiss stated, “It's funny that people are only noticing it now because I feel like that revival has been happening for the last six years...It doesn't seem new to me, but if it's new to them, let them enjoy it."

References

Emo
2010s in music
2010s fads and trends
Alternative rock genres
Indie rock
Punk rock genres
Post-hardcore
Pop punk
American styles of music
American rock music genres
British styles of music
British rock music genres
Retro-style music